Toxochitona ankole is a butterfly in the family Lycaenidae. It is found in Uganda (from the western part of the country to the Kibale and Kalinzu forests). The habitat consists of forests.

References

Endemic fauna of Uganda
Butterflies described in 1967
Poritiinae